Zayra Álvarez is a Puerto Rican singer and musician, currently based in Texas.  Zayra has recorded in the genres of rock en español, Latin pop and EDM.

Music career
Raised in Arroyo, Puerto Rico she attended the University of Puerto Rico, majoring in Industrial Engineering. Subsequently, she moved to Texas, where she became active in the local club scene, and signed a record deal with Brando Records. She recorded her debut album, Ruleta, in Spanish. A few months later, Kevin Lawrie at Sony Norte heard the tracks and signed her to the Miami-based label. Alvarez continued to work in the Latin music scene, getting airplay for her debut single "Hoy" on stations throughout Puerto Rico and the US. Picky Talarico directed the video for "Hoy", which was shot on location in Buenos Aires, Argentina. After a program director for Entravision Communications happened upon her performing at the Grove in Los Angeles, "Hoy" enjoyed further airplay, which led Sony Norte to release a second single, "Cada Momento".

While touring and performing in Texas, Alvarez became close friends with her Brando Records label mates Blue October, who invited her to sing on two songs: "Come in Closer" off of their album History for Sale and "Into the Ocean" from their platinum-selling album Foiled.

Alvarez landed a spot on the CBS TV show Rockstar: Supernova in 2006. Her performances met with mixed reviews. Los Angeles Times pop music critic Ann Powers stated that "Rockstar's most intriguing contestant, the Puerto Rican punk chanteuse Zayra Alvarez", while her hometown paper, the Dallas Observer, referred to her as having a "serious, possibly fatal, pitch deficiency". Marc Hirsh declared that "Zayra quickly learned to own her weirdness and start driving it without fear... without changing her style or even necessarily improving, she revealed herself to be what allmusic.com's postseason roundtable referred to as 'the most exciting, original, and audacious' singer in the entire competition." TMZ referred to her as the "breakout star" of the show. During her tenure, she covered many well-known songs, including "Call Me", "867-5309/Jenny", and "Everybody Hurts". On week 7, Alvarez performed her original song, "Lluvia de Mar". She was eliminated from the show on August 16.

After the show, Alvarez dropped her last name and became known simply as Zayra. Her third album, Baby Likes To Bang, was released on September 14, 2010 by Brando Records. The album was a stylistic shift, more influenced by dance music. The album spawned two singles, "V.I.P." and "Baby Likes To Bang." "V.I.P." was a Top 5 Billboard Dance Club Hit, and "Baby Likes To Bang", released subsequently, was declared a #1 Dance Breakout by Billboard'''.

Her songs have been covered by singer Marcela Mendez.

In 2019, Zayra prepared to launch a new album, under the name Nena Catalina." This album "50/50" was released on April 29, 2022.

Other ventures

Zayra acted in the independent film "Lycanthrope." The movie features one of her original songs, "This Is Love", which can be found on the re-release of her album "Ruleta".
She has worked as a photographer for Blue October and co-directed a music video for Tori Velasquez with Merritt Fields. In 2014, Zayra started a line of prints she illustrated named The Sleepy Heads Collection by Pepper Love. She has also designed jewelry for the line Z+V for Vinca in addition to working as an interior designer.

Discography
Studio albums
 Breaking Up Gray Skies (2002)
 Baby Likes to Bang (2010)

Appearances in other albums
 Blue October - History for Sale, guest vocals on "Come in Closer"
 Blue October - Argue With a Tree, guest vocals on "Come in Closer"
 Blue October - Foiled, backing vocals on "Into the Ocean"
 Stormaid: The Concert''

References

External links

1974 births
Women guitarists
Women rock singers
Guitarists from Texas
American indie rock musicians
Latin music songwriters
Living people
People from Arroyo, Puerto Rico
21st-century Puerto Rican actresses
21st-century Puerto Rican women singers
Puerto Rican rock musicians
Puerto Rican rock singers
Puerto Rican singer-songwriters
Rock en Español musicians
American rock songwriters
Rockstar: Supernova contestants
University of Puerto Rico alumni
Women in Latin music
21st-century American women artists
21st-century American women guitarists
21st-century American guitarists
Singer-songwriters from Texas